Guillermo Amoedo Schultze (born 2 March 1983 in Montevideo) is a Uruguayan director and screenwriter, working in Santiago, Chile since 2007.

Amoedo is the cowriter, with Nicolás López, of the films Que Pena Tu Vida (2010), Que Pena Tu Boda (2011), Que Pena Tu Familia (2012), Mis Peores Amigos (2013) and, with Eli Roth, of the films Aftershock (2012), The Green Inferno (2013) and Knock Knock (2015).

He has also written and directed the TV films El Crack (2011), La Leyenda de El Crack (2015) and the feature films Retorno (2010) and The Stranger (2014).

Amoedo received a Bachelor of Communication at the University of Montevideo and later graduated as a Master in Screenwriting at the Universidad de los Andes, where he now teaches practice writing classes.

Filmography

Feature films

Short films

Television

Webseries

Awards
Sitges - Catalan International Film Festival
Won, Blood Window Award to the Best Iberoamerican Film, "The Stranger" (2014)
Nominated, Grand Prize of European Fantasy Film in Silver, Official Fantàstic Panorama Selection, "Mis peores amigos: Promedio rojo el regreso" (2013)

References

Further reading

External links
 

1983 births
People from Montevideo
Uruguayan expatriates in Chile
Uruguayan screenwriters
Uruguayan film directors
Living people
University of Montevideo alumni